James C.H. Shen (July 2, 1909 Shanghai – July 12, 2007 Taipei) was a Taiwanese diplomat. Shen served as the last official Republic of China ambassador to the United States before the U.S. switched its diplomatic recognition to the People's Republic of China in 1979.

Early life
James Shen was born in Shanghai, Qing Dynasty in 1909. Shen was educated at Yenching University, which was located in Beijing. He earned his Master's degree in journalism at the University of Missouri in 1935.

Shen worked as a reporter and editor early in his career. He reported for media agencies throughout China, Taiwan and Hong Kong.

Additionally, Shen began work as an analyst and commentator for the Chinese government. His early government positions included "section chief" of the Ministry of Information's international department and as a department director for the Government Information Office (GIO).

Diplomatic career
Shen served for a time as an English-Chinese language interpreter and secretary  for Chinese Nationalist leader Chiang Kai-shek. He was then appointed spokesman for the Ministry of Foreign Affairs and head of the GIO.

Shen fled to Taiwan with the Nationalists when Chiang Kai-shek moved his government to Taipei following their defeat by Mao Zedong's Communist forces in 1949.  Shen served as Taiwan's ambassador to Australia from 1966 until 1968 before returning to Taiwan to become vice minister of foreign affairs between 1968 and 1971.

James Shen was appointed Republic of China ambassador to the United States in 1971. Shen arrived in Washington D.C. to assume his post just months before U.S. President Richard Nixon visited mainland China on an official visit.  While in China, Nixon signed a communiqué with Mao Zedong's government.  The communique officially created the United States's One-China policy which acknowledged The People's Republic of China's position that there is but one China and Taiwan is part of China. The U.S. does not recognize The People's Republic of China's position and insists on the peaceful resolution of cross-Strait differences, opposes unilateral changes to the status quo by either side, and encourages both sides to continue their constructive dialogue on the basis of dignity and respect.

James Shen continued his efforts throughout the 1970s to persuade the United States to continue to recognize Taiwan and the Nationalists.  The Nationalists and the United States had been important World War II and Cold War allies until the Nixon Administration. Shen's diplomacy proved in vain.  The United States, under President Jimmy Carter, officially severed diplomatic relations with Taiwan in 1979 as part of its One-China policy.

James Shen returned to Taipei in January 1979 and retired.  He wrote a highly critical book about the US withdrawing its recognition of Taiwan, the event of which he was a first-hand witness. Shen died at his home in Taipei on July 12, 2007, following a lengthy illness. He was 98 years old and was survived by his wife, Wei-yi Shen.

Since 1979, Taiwan no longer maintains an embassy in the United States, since there are no official diplomatic relations between the two countries.  However, Taiwan continues to operate a representative office in Washington D.C., called the Taipei Economic and Cultural Representative Office in the United States, with offices in twelve other American cities.

References

1909 births
2007 deaths
University of Missouri alumni
Ambassadors of the Republic of China to the United States
Representatives of Taiwan to the United States
Taiwanese people from Shanghai